Tania Brishty is a Bangladeshi model and actress. She is the winner of the second runner-up of the Veet Channel i Competition. Tania has debuted in the film Ghasful in 2015. She has also acted in several Bangla TV dramas.

Early life and education 
Tania was born in Munshigang|, Bangladesh. She completed her school from Habibullah Bahar College and currently studying BBA.Her father worked abroad for many years. Tania has two younger sisters. Her older sister Sonia Akhter is a tennis player at the national level. Tania has been learning dance since childhood.

Career 
Tania Brishty is the second runner-up of Veet-Channel i Top Model 2012. She began her career in modelling and participated in several dance programs and TV dramas. Starting her career in modelling, she has later turned her career to the Dhalliwood films. She began her acting career in TV.

Filmography

TV dramas
Valo Thakar 7 Upay
Ora Bokhate
Pokay Khaoya Kuri
House Wife
Somadhan
Mon Theke Dure Noy
Valobashar Gondogol
Chiro kumar mone mone

References

Further reading
 
 
 
 
 
 
 
 
 
 
 

Living people
Bangladeshi film actresses
Bangladeshi female models
Bangladeshi television actresses
21st-century Bangladeshi actresses
Year of birth missing (living people)